Carex uda, the Uda needle sedge, is a species of flowering plant in the family Cyperaceae, native to the southern Russian Far East, Manchuria, Korea, and Japan. It is a widespread species, found in meadows.

References

uda
Flora of Amur Oblast
Flora of Primorsky Krai
Flora of Sakhalin
Flora of Manchuria
Flora of Korea
Flora of Japan
Plants described in 1859